The Janjua (also spelt Janjuah or Janjhua) is a Punjabi Rajput clan found predominantly in the Pothohar Plateau of Pakistani Punjab. They are sometimes classified as Jats.

History

Connection with the Hindu Shahis 
The 10th century Arab historian Masudi mentioned that in his time the kings of Gandhara were all called "" (which has been variously read Hajaj, J.haj or Ch'hach), while the area of Gandhara itself was called "country of the Rahbūt" (Rajputs). Elliot transliterated the character to "Hahaj" and Cunningham had it equated to the Janjua tribe/clan, who were held to be descendants of Juan-Juan Khaganate. Rahman transliterates the term to "J.haj", an Arabicised form of Chhachh, which is even today the name of the region around the Hindu Shahi capital of Hund.

Fort of Sialkot
Sultãn Firuz Shãh Tughluq gave the custody of Sialkot Fort to the inhabitants of Janjua tribe.

Mughal period
In the 16th century, the Mughal Emperor Humayun was usurped by the Pashtun king Sher Shah Suri, who constructed the Rohtas Fort in Punjab to check Humayun's entry into Hindustan, and also to keep a check on the local tribes including Gakhars as well as Janjuas.

According to Abu al-Fadl (c. 1595), the Janjua Rajput and Ghakkar zamindars domianated the Sind Sagar Doab of the Mughal Empire.

Sikh period
The expansion of the Sikh Empire, spearheaded by Ranjit Singh, was met with a rebellion by the Janjua Sultan of Watli, Sultan Fateh Muhammad Khan. A six-month siege of Kusuk Fort in Watli followed and this was ended when the inhabitants ran short of water.

The Kala Khan branch of Rawalpindi Janjuas fortunes were also eclipsed by the rise of the Sikh Empire.

British period
By the time the British Raj took an interest in conquering the Sikhs in 1848–49, they were joined by opportunistic tribes such as the Janjua, Gakhars and Awans who had lost control of their centuries-old ancestral kingdoms to the imperial Sikh Empire and sought revenge. Tai Yong Tan says that "Besides being impressed with their track record, the British saw in them, with their traditional and historical enmity against the Sikhs, an effective counterpoise against the latter."

The Janjua rebellion against the Sikh Empire was a political rebellion, as the Janjua were initially keen allies to the Sukerchakia Misl.

During the nineteenth century, they were listed as a martial race. During this period, due to their high aristocratic status, the Janjuas refused to serve in any regiment that was not commanded by either a Janjua or another commander of equal social standing. This preference was honoured by the British when selecting regiments for them.

Notable People
Tikka Khan, Pakistan army general who served as the Military Governor of East Pakistan in 1971 and later became the first Chief of Army staff from 1972 to 1976.
Asif Nawaz Janjua, Chief of staff for the Pakistan Army from 1991 till his poisoning and death in 1993
Iftikhar Janjua, Major General of the Pakistan Army, fought and died in the Battle of Chamb
Labh Janjua, Indian Singer

References

Rajput clans
Punjabi tribes
Jat clans of Punjab
Social groups of Punjab, India
Social groups of Haryana
Hindu surnames
Indian surnames
Social groups of Jammu and Kashmir
Social groups of Pakistan
History of Pakistan